Yash Tonk (born 30 October 1971) is an Indian actor from Sonipat District, Haryana.

Early life
Yash Tonk was brought up at Hisar, Haryana where his father works as Chief Security officer in Haryana Agricultural University, Hisar. He studied at Campus School in Hisar. He graduated from Sri Aurobindo College University of Delhi.

Personal life
Yash is married to Gauri Yadav. Gauri is also an actress and they were a popular couple on the TV show Nach Baliye  and they also made it to the finals. They have two daughters, Pari Tonk and Myrah Tonk.

Filmography

Films

Television
  Karma: Mayavi Nagari - Karma
  Kuch Toh Hai Tere Mere Darmiyaan - Thakur
 Yeh Vaada Raha - Ranveer Khanna
 Ek Thhi Naayka - Dheeraj Dasgupta
 Byaah Hamari Bahoo Ka - Yash Purohit
 Sarvggun Sampanna - Karan Kapadia (K.K.)
 Tere Liye - Padmanabhan 
 Nach Baliye 2 - Himself
 Kyunki Saas Bhi Kabhi Bahu Thi - Shiv Singhania
 Kaho Naa Yaar Hai - Himself
 Arre Deewano Mujhe Pehchano - Himself
 Karam Apnaa Apnaa - Shiv / Samar Kapoor
 Kesar - Harman
 Kasautii Zindagii Kay - Debo
 Kaahin Kissii Roz - Kunal Sikand / Nikhil Arya / Kuljeet Singh / Ramola ka per pota
 Karam - Jai
 Kundali - Abhishek Agarwal
 Just Mohabbat - Harveer Singh Sodhi
 Saara Akaash - Kabir / Suresh Desai
 Shobha Somnath Ki - Dadda Chalukya
 Jaat Ki Jugni - Choudhary Gajendra Singh Ahlawat
 Roop - Mard Ka Naya Swaroop - Shamsher Singh
 Pavitra Bandhan - Gireesh Roy Chaudhri
 Kyun Utthe Dil Chhod Aaye (2021) - Brij Kishore Sahani
 Swaran Ghar (2022) - Baljeet "Ballu " Bedi
 Dhruv Tara – Samay Sadi Se Pare (2023) - Maharaj Udaybhan Singh

Nominations

References

External links

1971 births
Living people
Indian male television actors
Indian male film actors
People from Hisar (city)
People from Sonipat district
Campus School, CCS HAU alumni
Indian male soap opera actors
Male actors from Haryana
Actors from Mumbai